My Lady's Slipper is a lost 1916 silent film romance-drama directed by Ralph Ince and starring Anita Stewart and Earle Williams.

Cast
Anita Stewart - Countess de Villars
Earle Williams - Lt. Francis Burnham
Joseph Kilgour - King Louis XVI
Julia Swayne Gordon - Marie Antoinette
Harry Northrup - Marquis du Tremignon
George O'Donnell - duc de Riveau-Huet
Albert Roccardi - Bucknall
Charles Chapman - Benjamin Franklin
George Stevens - Espiau
William Shea - Bucknail (uncredited)

References

External links
 My Lady's Slipper at IMDb.com

1916 films
American silent feature films
Lost American films
Films directed by Ralph Ince
Vitagraph Studios films
American black-and-white films
American romantic drama films
1916 romantic drama films
1910s American films
Silent romantic drama films
Silent American drama films
1910s English-language films